Michal Chovan (born November 23, 1987) is a Slovak professional ice hockey player who is currently playing for HC Košice of the Slovak Extraliga.

Career
Chovan grew up in Zvolen, playing minor and junior ice hockey for the local club. He was never drafted. He made his Extraliga debut in the 2005–06 season. He was scoring leader of HKm in 2010–11 season, earning 41 points in 49 games.

Career statistics

Regular season and playoffs
Bold indicates led league

Awards and honors

References

External links

 

1987 births
HKM Zvolen players
HC 07 Detva players
HC Oceláři Třinec players
Stadion Hradec Králové players
HK Poprad players
HK Neman Grodno players
Motor České Budějovice players
HC Košice players
Living people
Slovak ice hockey right wingers
Sportspeople from Zvolen
Slovak expatriate ice hockey players in the Czech Republic
Slovak expatriate sportspeople in Belarus
Expatriate ice hockey players in Belarus